Prairie Dell is an unincorporated community in Bell County, Texas, United States. According to the Handbook of Texas, the community had an estimated population of 12 in 2000. The community is part of the Killeen-Temple-Fort Hood metropolitan area.

History
Prairie Dell had a country store on a trail from South Texas to Kansas that herded cattle in the late 1860s. A post office was established at Prairie Dell in 1877, closed that next year, then reopened in 1893. There were 75 residents served by two Baptist churches, one Presbyterian church, two general stores, a drugstore, a mill and gin, and a blacksmith shop in 1896. The community's population zenith was said to be 134 in 1904. There were two churches and one business in Prairie Dell in 1948. The population dropped to 20 in 1964. There was one church left in the community in 1990 and had a population of 12 in 2000.

Geography

Education
In 1903, Prairie Dell had a school with 129 students and two teachers, making it one of the largest schools in the county. It had two schools in 1948. Today, the community is served by the Belton Independent School District.

In popular culture
The climax to the movie The Texas Chainsaw Massacre 2 was filmed at the closed Matterhorn amusement park in Prairie Dell.

References

Unincorporated communities in Bell County, Texas
Unincorporated communities in Texas
Killeen–Temple–Fort Hood metropolitan area